St. Mary's Church is a medieval stone church located in Maaria, in Turku, Finland. There are no records as to when the present church was built, but the work was probably started in the mid or late 15th century. According to Markus Hiekkanen, the church was probably built in the 1440s, on the basis of the style of the closets; the gables were constructed about 50 years later.  There are medieval limestone paintings on the walls, which are not common to other places in Finland. The most valuable artefacts are the wooden altar cabinet and a large altarpiece depicting Christ on the cross.

References

External links

St Mary's Church
Maarian kirkko rakennusperintörekisterissä

Lutheran churches in Turku
Medieval stone churches in Finland
Gothic architecture in Finland